Hokushin Dam  is a rockfill dam located in Hokkaido Prefecture in Japan. The dam is used for water supply. The catchment area of the dam is 24.6 km2. The dam impounds about 71  ha of land when full and can store 6700 thousand cubic meters of water. The construction of the dam was started on 1976 and completed in 1980.

References

Dams in Hokkaido